Xinglong Town (兴隆镇) could refer to a number of towns in China:

Chongqing
Xinglong, Nanchuan District, Chongqing
Xinglong, Yubei District, Chongqing
Xinglong, Fengjie County
Xinglong, Youyang County

Guizhou
Xinglong, Anlong County
Xinglong, Meitan County

Hebei
Xinglong Town, Hebei

Heilongjiang
Xinglong, Bayan County
Xinglong, Youyi County

Henan
Xinglong, Sheqi County

Hubei
Xinglong, Hubei, in Zaoyang

Hunan
Xinglong, Xinhuang County, in Xinhuang Dong Autonomous County

Jilin
Xinglong, Jiutai
Xinglong, Shuangliao

Liaoning
Xinglong, Liaoyang County
Xinglong, Xinmin

Ningxia
Xinglong, Xiji County

Shaanxi
Xinglong, Jingyang County
Xinglong, Pingli County
Xinglong, Zhenba County

Shandong
Xinglong, Linyi County

Sichuan
Xinglong, Zigong, in Yantan District
Xinglong, Guanghan
Xinglong, Mianzhu
Xinglong, Anyue County
Xinglong, Luding County
Xinglong, Shuangliu County
Xinglong, Yuechi County
Xinglong, Zhongjiang County

External links